The Hawks may refer to:

The Hawks (band), a back-up band of singer Ronnie Hawkins
The Band, or "Levon & The Hawks", which originated from the Hawks
 The Hawks, a band with British musical artist Stephen Duffy
The Hawks (South Africa), The South African Police Services' Directorate for Priority Crime Investigation (DPCI)
Atlanta Hawks, an American professional basketball team
Illawarra Hawks, an Australian professional basketball team

See also
Hawks (disambiguation)